The men's pole vault event at the 1985 IAAF World Indoor Games was held at the Palais Omnisports Paris-Bercy on 19 January.

Results

References

Pole
Pole vault at the World Athletics Indoor Championships